George W. Adey (1869 – after 1901) was an English professional footballer born in Handsworth, Birmingham, who played as a wing half or inside forward. He made 71 appearances for Small Heath in the Football League, and went on to play for Kettering of the Southern League.

In a 1901 profile of the Small Heath club and players in the Daily Express, C.B. Fry wrote that "Adey is not showy, but he is a fine tackler, and remarkably persistent", and that he and his half-back colleagues Alex Leake and Walter Wigmore "get through an amount of work that is simply astonishing".

References

1869 births
Year of death missing
Footballers from Birmingham, West Midlands
English footballers
Association football midfielders
Stourbridge F.C. players
Birmingham City F.C. players
Kettering Town F.C. players
Date of birth missing
Footballers from Handsworth, West Midlands